The komes ("count")  Nicholas was a local ruler in Bulgaria, probably of Armenian origin, and progenitor of the Cometopuli ("the sons of the count") dynasty.

According to the Armenian chronicler Stephen of Taron, the family originated in the Armenian region of Derdjan. He was married to Ripsime or Hripsime, seen as a daughter of King Ashot II of Armenia. However, Ashot ll and his wife Marie of Kachen are not known to have had children.  The couple had four sons, David, Moses, Aron, and Samuel, who are collectively known as the Cometopuli (from Greek Kometopouloi, "sons of the komes"; Armenian կոմսաձագ Komsajagk). Sometime in the 970s—the exact date is unclear and disputed—the brothers launched a successful rebellion against the Byzantine Empire, that had recently subdued Bulgaria; after the early death of his brothers, Samuel remained as the undisputed leader of Bulgaria, ruling as Tsar from 996 until his death in 1014.

Other than that, nothing is known of Nicholas. He may have ruled Serdica or, according to other sources, was a local count in the region of the modern North Macedonia. The family appanage was located above the village of Palatovo, according to legend and a number of archeological data in the neighborhood. 

In 992/3, Samuel erected at German, near Lake Prespa, an inscription commemorating his parents and his brother David.

Family tree

References

Sources 
 
 

Medieval Bulgarian nobility
10th-century births
10th-century deaths
10th-century Armenian people
10th-century Bulgarian people
Cometopuli dynasty